The Roman Catholic Diocese of Bagé is a diocese located in the city of Bagé in the Ecclesiastical province of Pelotas in Brazil.

History
 25 June 1960: Established as Diocese of Bagé from the Diocese of Pelotas and Diocese of Uruguaiana

Bishops
 Bishops of Bagé (Latin Rite)
 José Gomes (18 March 1961 – 16 July 1968), appointed Bishop of Chapecó, Santa Catarina
 Angelo Félix Mugnol (15 January 1969 – 12 February 1982)
 Laurindo Guizzardi, C.S. (12 February 1982 - 28 November 2001), appointed Bishop of Foz do Iguaçu, Parana
 Gílio Felício (11 December 2002 – 6 June 2018)
 Cleonir Paulo Dalbosco, O.F.M. Cap. (26 September 2018 – present)

Coadjutor bishop
Laurindo Guizzardi, C.S. (1982)

Other priest of this diocese who became bishop
Roque Paloschi, appointed Bishop of Roraima, Roraima in 2005

References
 GCatholic.org
 Catholic Hierarchy

Roman Catholic dioceses in Brazil
Christian organizations established in 1960
Bagé, Roman Catholic Diocese of
Roman Catholic dioceses and prelatures established in the 20th century
1960 establishments in Brazil